

External links

2011 in United States case law
2012 in United States case law